The Union Seamount is a seamount located in the Pacific Ocean off the coast of northern Vancouver Island, British Columbia, Canada.

References
British Columbia Marine Topography

See also
Volcanism of Canada
Volcanism of Western Canada
List of volcanoes in Canada

Seamounts of the Pacific Ocean
Volcanoes of British Columbia
Seamounts of Canada